Georgia Schmidt was an American actress of German descent. 
Schmidt was the original voice of the Mrs. Beasley doll made by Mattel. She is probably best known as playing the first Talosian alien in the first episode of the original Star Trek series titled "The Cage", later aired as "The Menagerie" in 1966.

Selected filmography 

 87th Precinct (1962, TV Series) as Hotchkiss
 House of the Damned (1963) as Priscilla Rochester
 Goodbye Charlie (1964) as Seamstress (uncredited)
 Bewitched (1965, TV Series) as Agatha
 Star Trek: The Original Series (1966, TV Series) as First Talosian (uncredited)
 The Monkees (1966-1967, TV Series) as Jane, the Leading Lady /  Old Lady
 The Wild Wild West (1967, TV Series) as Scrub Woman
 Night Gallery (1971, TV Series) as Flower Lady (segment "Make Me Laugh")
 Family Affair (1971, TV Series) as Mrs. Beasley (a doll store owner who receives Buffy's Mrs. Beasley doll when Buffy chooses to let go of dolls in her life)
 The Andromeda Strain (1971) as Old lady (Piedmont) (uncredited)
 Kansas City Bomber (1972)  as Old Dame
 Dominic's Dream (1974, TV Movie) as Old Lady
 Little House on the Prairie (1974-1983, TV Series) as Adel Colie / Mrs. Grandy
 The Odd Couple (1975, TV Series) as Mabel / Mrs. Osgood
 Starsky and Hutch (1975, TV Series) as Maggie McMillan
 Police Woman (1975-1977, TV Series) as Old Lady / Elderly Lady #2
 The Happy Hooker Goes to Washington (1977) as Couple at Airport
 A Killing Affair (1977, TV Movie) as Mrs. Macy
 Goin' South (1978) as Florence
 Charlie's Angels (1979, TV Series) as Granny
 CHiPs (1979, TV Series) as Little Old Lady
 Kill the Golden Goose (1979) as Woman Patient
 Midnight Madness (1980) as Old lady in car
 Flo (1980, TV Series) as Inez
 WKRP in Cincinnati (1980, TV Series) as Elderly Woman
 Magnum, P.I. (1981, TV Series) as Old Lady in Accident
 The Incredible Hulk (1981, TV Series) as Librarian
 Terror at Alcatraz (1982, TV Movie) as Nancy Wheeler
 Knight Rider (1984, TV Series) as Little Old Lady
 Hill Street Blues (1984, TV Series) as Dorothy Fadden
 Highway to Heaven (1984-1986, TV Series) as Mrs. Caldy / Loretta (final appearance)
 The Twilight Zone (1985, TV Series) as Wife (segment "Night of the Meek")
 The Facts of Life (1986, TV Series) as Elderly Woman

External links 
 

American people of German descent
20th-century American actresses
1904 births
1997 deaths